Spachea is a genus in the Malpighiaceae, a family of about 75 genera of flowering plants in the order Malpighiales. Spachea comprises 6 species of shrubs and trees growing in wet forests.  One species (S. martiana) occurs in Cuba, 2 species in southern Central America with one of those also in adjacent Colombia, and 3 species in northern South America (including Trinidad). Spachea correae, native to Costa Rica and Panama, is listed in the IUCN Red List of Threatened Species.

Spachea perforata, common name soufriere tree, is the national flower of St. Vincent and the Grenadines.

References

External links
Malpighiaceae Malpighiaceae - description, taxonomy, phylogeny, and nomenclature
Spachea

Malpighiaceae
Malpighiaceae genera
Taxonomy articles created by Polbot